Melcom is a supermarket chain consisting of 42 shops spread all over Ghana. It was started in 1989 by Indian  magnate Bhagwan Khubchandani. His late father, Ramchand Khubchandani, had arrived in the then Gold Coast in 1929 as a 14-year-old to work as a store boy. Melcom Group of Companies is a family business.

The Melcom Group of Companies consists of six separate entities: Melcom Limited, Century Industries Limited, Crownstar Electronic Industries Limited, Melcom Hospitality, Melcom Travels, and Melcom Care. Aside from conquering an extensive retail market share with a network of 42 retail outlets spread all over Ghana (Melcom Limited), the Group is well-diversified into other businesses.

Melcom Group is best known for its shopping mall, Melcom Limited. As Ghana’s largest chain of retail department stores, Melcom offers thousands of products and hundreds of well known brands.

History

Disasters in 2012
In 2012 Melcom suffered two major accidents. On 7 November 2012, Ghana suffered a major accident when Melcom's five story shopping mall at Achimota near Accra, Ghana collapsed, trapping many people inside. The NADMO organized a rescue mission. 82 people in all, including 14 dead, were pulled out of the rubble.

Melcom had been operating in the building, which it said it had rented, only since January 2012. The NADMO promised an investigation to find out the cause of the collapse. Reports suggested that the building had structural defects owing to lack of adherence to building codes and use of improper materials.

On December 22, 2012, Melcom suffered another major accident when its mall in Agona Swedru in the Central Region of Ghana was totally burnt down by fire and attended to by the GNFRS. Because the fire occurred after close of work, there were no casualties. However, adjoining warehouses stocked with items for Christmas were also burnt down.

References

Supermarkets of Africa
Engineering failures
Food and drink companies of Ghana
Companies established in 1989
1989 establishments in Ghana